Scathophaga reses is a species of dung fly in the family Scathophagidae.

References

Scathophagidae
Articles created by Qbugbot
Insects described in 1893